Jean-Pierre Berçot was the French ambassador to Chad until November 2006. On 1 August 2004, he said that France would deploy 200 soldiers to help secure Chad's eastern border with Sudan's conflict-torn Darfur region. He was prefect of Saint-Pierre and Miquelon.

Notes

Year of birth missing (living people)
Living people
French politicians
Ambassadors of France to Chad
Prefects of Saint Pierre and Miquelon
Saint Pierre and Miquelon politicians